The Black Moshannon Observatory (BMO) was an astronomical observatory owned and operated by
Pennsylvania State University. The observatory was closed some time after August 1995.

Telescope

The observatory's main telescope was a  reflecting telescope. The primary instrument attached to the telescope was a fiber-fed, cross-dispersed echelle spectrograph.  Astronomers used this instrument to study chromospherically active stars, binary stars, and pre–main sequence stars.

See also
 List of astronomical observatories

References

External links
 Department of Astronomy and Astrophysics at Pennsylvania State University

Astronomical observatories in Pennsylvania
Pennsylvania State University
Defunct astronomical observatories
1972 establishments in Pennsylvania